Ice hockey at the 1990 Asian Winter Games took place in the city of Sapporo, Japan. Just like in the inaugural edition of the Winter Asian Games, only four nations competed in the sport: China, Japan, South Korea and North Korea.

The competition was held at the Tsukisamu Gymnasium from 10 to 13 March.

Schedule

Medalists

Results

Final standing

References
Results of the Second Winter Asian Games

External links
Results

 
1990
1990 Asian Winter Games events
1990
Winter
Ice hockey in Japan
1989–90 in Japanese ice hockey